Tara Flynn is an Irish actress and writer.

Career
Flynn has written three satirical books: You're Grand: The Irishwoman's Secret Guide to Life, Giving Out Yards: The Art of Complaint, Irish Style and Rage-In: Trolls and Tribulations of Modern Life 

She was a founding member of comedy singing group "The Nualas".

She is a voice artist and was the voice of Molly in RTE's The Morbegs.

She uses satire for activism, as in YouTube sketches such as "Racist B&B", "Armagayddon" and "The Case for Mammy / Daddy Marriage".

In 2015, as part of Amnesty International Ireland's "She is not a Criminal" campaign, she spoke publicly for the first time about travelling to the Netherlands for an abortion (abortion was illegal in Ireland at the time). She has since been a vocal campaigner for reproductive rights and the repeal of Ireland's 8th amendment.

In 2017, Flynn provided the voiceover on TV3's remake of Blind Date. She took over the role first done by Graham Skidmore in the original 1980s show.

In 2021 and 2022 Tara joined Marian Keyes for a BBC Radio 4 programme Now You're Asking, in which they discussed problems sent in by listeners (they called them "askers").

References

External links

Now You're Asking with Marian Keyes and Tara Flynn (BBC Radio 4)

Abortion in the Republic of Ireland
Irish voice actresses
Irish women comedians
Living people
Year of birth missing (living people)